Portal Point is a narrow point in the northeast part of Reclus Peninsula, on the west coast of Graham Land. In 1956, a Falkland Islands Dependencies Survey (FIDS) hut was established on the point, from which a route to the plateau was established. So named by the United Kingdom Antarctic Place-Names Committee (UK-APC) in 1960 because the point is the "gateway" of the route.

Cape Reclus Refuge
Cape Reclus Refuge is a British refuge, managed by the British Antarctic Survey, located at Portal Point on the Reclus Peninsula. The hut was inaugurated on 13 December 1956 and remained active until April 25, 1958. A four men team, led by Wally Herbert completed the first traverse from Hope Bay to Cape Reclus in 1957, they wintered in the refuge and carried out local survey. The refuge was dismantled in March 1996 and transported to the Falkland Islands Museum and National Trust where was rebuilt inside the new Museum in 2014.

Biology
Portal point often has numerous Weddell seals hauled out near the landing. There are no penguin colonies because of the abundant snow cover.

Geography

Portal Point is a snow and ice-covered point consisting of Mesozoic granite.

See also
 List of Antarctic field camps

References

 

Headlands of Graham Land
Danco Coast